Norfolk Island competed at the 2015 Pacific Games in Port Moresby, Papua New Guinea from 4 to 18 July 2015. Norfolk Island listed 13 competitors as of 19 June 2015.

Athletics

Norfolk Island qualified 1 athlete in track and field.

Women
Field events

Golf

Norfolk Island qualified 4 male golfers for the games.

Lawn bowls

Norfolk Island has qualified 6 athletes.

Tess Evans
Ryan Dixon
Matt Bigg
Trev Gow
Gary Bigg
Phil Jones

Shooting

Norfolk Island has qualified 2 athletes.

Men
 Doug Creek  – 10 m air pistol male,  – 25 m pistol mixed.
 Kevin Coulter  – 10 m air pistol male.

References

2015 in Norfolk Island
Nations at the 2015 Pacific Games
Norfolk Island at the Pacific Games